Maroochydore is an urban centre in the central Sunshine Coast region of Queensland, Australia.

Maroochydore may also refer to:
 Maroochydore (suburb), its central business district
 Electoral district of Maroochydore, an electoral district of the Legislative Assembly of Queensland